American Gigolo is a 1980 feature film, written and directed by Paul Schrader and starring Richard Gere.

American Gigolo may also refer to:
American Gigolo (soundtrack), soundtrack album to the abovementioned feature film
American Gigolo (TV series), an American drama television series based on the film
"American Gigolo," a song by Weezer from their 2002 album Maladroit

See also
"American Gigg-olo", an episode of the animated television sitcom Family Guy